KKP may refer to:
Communist Party of Kurdistan (Turkish: Kürdistan Komünist Partisi, KKP)
Confederation of the Polish Crown (Polish: Konfederacja Korony Polskiej, KKP)
Christian Conservative Party (Norwegian: Kristent Konservativt Parti, KKP)
National Coordinating Commission (Polish: Krajowa Komisja Porozumiewawcza, KKP), the executive branch of the Solidarity trade union
Philippsburg Nuclear Power Plant (German: Kernkraftwerk Philippsburg, KKP)
Ministry of Marine Affairs and Fisheries (Indonesia) (Indonesian: Kementerian Kelautan dan Perikanan, KKP)
Koko-Bera language (ISO 639:kkp) 
Kouassi Kouamé Patrice, a politician from Ivory Coast 
Kung Kao Po, a Chinese language newspaper in Hong Kong
Kiatnakin Bank, a Thai bank (Stock symbol: KKP)
Kamgar Kisan Paksha, now defunct political party of India

See also 
 Kappa Kappa Psi, a fraternity for college and university band members in the United States, akso known as KKPsi
 KK thesis, or KK principle, can be stated as: "Kp→KKp" (Knowing p implies the knowing of knowing p)